The 2010 Iranian Futsal 1st Division will be divided into two phases..

The league will also be composed of 20 teams divided into two divisions of 10 teams each, whose teams will be divided geographically. Teams will play only other teams in their own division, once at home and once away for a total of 20 matches each.

Teams

Group A

Group B

Play Off 
First leg to be played Julay 23, 2010; return leg to be played Julay 30, 2010

 Naft Omidiyeh Promoted to the 1st Division.

First leg

Return leg 

 Misagh Tehran Promoted to the 1st Division.

See also 
 2009–10 Iranian Futsal Super League
 2009–10 Iran Futsal's 1st Division
 2009–10 Persian Gulf Cup
 2009–10 Azadegan League
 2009–10 Iran Football's 2nd Division
 2009–10 Iran Football's 3rd Division
 2009–10 Hazfi Cup
 Iranian Super Cup
 List of Iranian futsal clubs in 2009–10 season

References 

Iran Futsal's 2nd Division seasons
3
3